Rhodocantha is a genus of moths of the family Crambidae. It contains only one species, Rhodocantha diagonalis, which is found in North America, where it has been recorded from New Mexico and Texas.

References

Natural History Museum Lepidoptera genus database

Odontiini
Taxa named by Eugene G. Munroe
Crambidae genera
Monotypic moth genera